The Kanwar Sanctuary is located in Parbati valley of Kullu district. R.O. wildlife Kasol provides information and help to visitors. Uphill walk along Garahan Nala from Kasol through dense Deodar and Fir forests is worth. The sanctuary has large population of Himalayan Tahr.

Access
Airport:-  Bhuntar (10-km from Kullu)
Railway:- The closest Railhead is at Jogindernagar (95 km from Kullu)
Road:- The sanctuary is well connected by road.
Delhi via Mandi:- 530 km
Shimla:- 240 km

References

External links
himachaltourism.nic.in
hptdc.gov.in
Kanwar Sanctuary

Wildlife sanctuaries in Himachal Pradesh
Geography of Kullu district
Protected areas with year of establishment missing